IPSC Canada is the Canadian association for practical shooting under the International Practical Shooting Confederation, and consists of nine sections: Alberta, British Columbia, Manitoba, New Brunswick, Newfoundland, Nova Scotia, Ontario, Quebec and Saskatchewan

See also 
IPSC Canadian Handgun Championship

External links

References 

Regions of the International Practical Shooting Confederation
Sports organizations of Canada